Christina Brown is a journalist, formerly an anchor and correspondent for MSNBC and NBC News.  She began working for MSNBC in June 2007 as anchor of overnight newsbreaks and the early morning programs Early Today and First Look, after five years with KTNV-TV in Las Vegas, Nevada and two years with KTSM-TV in El Paso, Texas, She left MSNBC/NBC News in 2010, She is now anchor of Arise News. She got her start in Radio/TV while enlisted in the Air Force.  She is a graduate of the University of Phoenix.  She holds a MS: Journalism, from Columbia University Graduate School of Journalism. She is also a veteran of the United States Air Force.

References

External links
 "In the Loop with journalist Christina Brown", By: Keli Goff at TheLoop21, July 21, 2010

Living people
American television news anchors
University of Phoenix alumni
Year of birth missing (living people)
Place of birth missing (living people)
American women television journalists
21st-century American women